This is a list of municipal poets laureate in British Columbia, Canada.

Comox Valley 
Comox Valley has had three poets laureate: Lawrence J.W. Cooper (2019-2021), Natalie Nickerson (2017-2019), and Kevin Flesher (2015-2017).

Nanaimo 
The Poets Laureate of Nanaimo include Kamal Parmar (2021-2023), Tina Biello (2017 – 2020), and Naomi Beth Wakan (2013 – 2016).

New Westminster 
New Westminster's Poets Laureate are Elliott Slin (2021–present), Alan Hill (2017 – 2020), Candice James (2010 – 2016), Don Benson (1999 – 2007), and Edna Anderson (1998 – 1999)

Surrey 
Surrey has had one poet laureate, Renée Sarojini Saklikar (2015 – 2018)

Tofino 
Tofino's poets laureate are Christine Lowther (2020-2022) and Joanna Streetly (2018 – 2020)

Vancouver 
Vancouver's poets laureate are Fiona Tinwei Lam (2022-–present), Miss Christie Lee (Christie Charles) (2018-2021), Rachel Rose (2014 – 2017), Evelyn Lau (2011 – 2014), Brad Cran (2009 – 2011), and George McWhirter (2007 – 2009).

Victoria 
Victoria's poets laureate are John Barton (2019 – 2022), Yvonne Blomer (2015 – 2018), Janet Marie Rogers (2012 – 2014), Linda Rogers (2009 – 2011), and Carla Funk (2006 – 2008).

See also

 Poet Laureate of Toronto
 Canadian Parliamentary Poet Laureate
 Municipal Poets Laureate in Alberta, Canada
 Municipal Poets Laureate in Ontario, Canada

References

Poets Laureate of places in Canada